Styrax pohlii is a species of tree in the family Styracaceae. It is native to South America.

References

pohlii
Trees of Brazil
Trees of Peru
Trees of Suriname
Trees of Bolivia